Albany Municipal Airport may refer to:

 Albany Municipal Airport (Missouri) in Albany, Missouri, United States (FAA: K19)
 Albany Municipal Airport (Oregon) in Albany, Oregon, United States (FAA: S12)
 Albany Municipal Airport (Texas) in Albany, Texas, United States (FAA: T23)

See also
Albany Airport (disambiguation)